Bagh-e Bala or Bagh Bala may refer to:
 Bagh-e Bala Palace, Kabul, Afghanistan
 Bagh-e Bala, Baghlan, Afghanistan
 Bagh-e Bala, Fars, Iran
 Bagh-e Bala, Hormozgan, Iran
 Bagh-e Bala, Narmashir, Kerman Province, Iran
 Bagh-e Bala, Lorestan, Iran
 Bagh-e Bala, Qom, Iran